Queen of Me is the sixth studio album by Canadian singer and songwriter Shania Twain. The album was released on February 3, 2023, by Republic Records. It is her first album since Now (2017), and is her first to not be released with her previous label of 29 years, Mercury Nashville. Also her first album to receive a Parental Advisory label. The album was promoted with the release of two singles: "Waking Up Dreaming" and "Giddy Up!", and will be supported by the "Queen of Me" World Tour starting in April 2023. Commercially, the album became her third number one album in the United Kingdom, and entered the top ten in Canada, Switzerland, Australia and the United States.

Background
After releasing the compilation album Greatest Hits in 2004, Twain released the single "Shoes" for the soundtrack to the television series Desperate Housewives. Later, experiencing the breakdown of her marriage, Twain divorced her longtime husband and songwriting partner, music producer Robert John "Mutt" Lange, in 2008. She remarried to Frédéric Thiébaud, the husband of her former best friend, in 2011. The same year, she released the promotional single "Today Is Your Day", which had a moderate impact on the charts.

Twain underwent vocal therapy after being diagnosed with dysphonia and Lyme disease, which caused her to nearly lose her singing voice; after which she embarked on a concert tour and Las Vegas residency before releasing Now in 2017. The album reached #1 in the United States, Canada, United Kingdom and Australia. Twain then embarked on the successful Now Tour as well as her second Las Vegas residency, Let's Go!.

Twain released a Netflix documentary, Not Just a Girl which documented her career to date as well as documenting some of the recording for her sixth studio album. Tracks previewed in the documentary include "Inhale/Exhale Air" and "Queen of Me".

Singles
Twain released "Waking Up Dreaming", the album's lead single on September 23, 2022 following its premiere on BBC Radio 2. A music video for the song, directed by Isaac Rentz, was released on the same day.

"Last Day of Summer", co-written with Jack Savoretti was released as the album's first promotional single on October 28, 2022, along with a lyric video.

The second single, "Giddy Up!" was released on January 5, 2023.

Promotion
On December 5, 2022, Twain performed the lead single, "Waking Up Dreaming" during a medley of her hits at the 48th People's Choice Awards. Twain promoted the album on The Late Show with Stephen Colbert on January 5, 2023.
On February 2, 2023, she appeared on The Kelly Clarkson Show and The Late Late Show with James Corden.

She will promote the album on the Queen of Me Tour, which is scheduled to begin in Spokane on April 28, 2023, and will end on November 14, in Vancouver, encompassing 76 dates.

Critical reception

On review aggregator Metacritic, Queen of Me received a score of 61 out of 100 based on nine reviews, indicating "generally favorable reviews". Imy Brighty-Potts of The Irish News wrote that "the record is a tour of all the best country sounds and tropes climbing the charts over the past few years – with Shania delivering powerful vocals despite undergoing open-throat surgery a few years ago." According to Ed Power of the Irish Examiner, "the 'Shania-issance' is in full swing", describing the album as "unashamedly pop" yet "Twain’s country roots are not entirely obscured". Allison Hussey of Pitchfork described the album as "a dozen tracks of optimistic affirmations and pumping electro-pop rhythms", but found the material "ill-suited to Twain's voice" and the lyrics rife with "forcibly modern idioms", concluding that Queen of Me "tries so hard to capture current trends that it already sounds behind the times". Billy Dukes of Taste of Country summarized that the album "feasts on contagious hooks and repetition", while Jon Freeman of Rolling Stone defined it as "an uplifting statement about being your own champion in the present". Annabel Ross of The Sydney Morning Herald wrote that Twain is "back to her poppy, peppy self... maintaining an upbeat vibe throughout." Piper Westrom of Riff Magazine wrote, "Queen of Me is everything fans of Shania Twain could hope for. At the same time, it's a perfect introduction for anyone who's not heard her to this point. Twain is making music that is fun, and she is having fun doing it."

In a more critical review of the album for AllMusic, Stephen Thomas Erlewine claimed that, "There's no question that she's game -- she throws herself into the songs, not hesitating when "Pretty Liar" calls for her to curse -- and her spirits are so high they nearly counter the cacophonic cheer of the production. Nevertheless, the end results feel curiously constrained, as if Twain was dancing in front of a mirror instead of underneath a mirrorball."

Commercial performance 
In Canada, Queen of Me debuted at number two on the Canadian Album Chart, becoming her sixth top-ten album on the chart and seventh overall in the country. 

In the United States, the album debuted at number 10 on the US Billboard 200, earning 38,000 equivalent album units, with 34,000 of those being album sales, becoming Twain's sixth top-ten album in the country. She joins Madonna as the only women with newly-charting Billboard 200 top 10s in the 1990s, 2000s, ’10s and ’20s (Madonna’s streak also includes the ’80s). The album also debuted on the Billboard Top Country Albums chart at No. 2, earning Twain her seventh top-five entry on the chart. 

In the United Kingdom, Queen of Me debuted atop the UK Albums Chart, becoming her third number one album in the country. Elsewhere, Queen of Me peaked within the top five in Australia and Switzerland, and charted in seven additional countries.

Track listing

Notes
  signifies a co-producer
  signifies an additional producer

Personnel
Performance

Brian Allen – bass (14)
Iain Archer – guitar (6)
Larry Campbell – acoustic guitar (13), banjo (13), electric guitar (13), violin (13)
Dave Cobb – electric guitar (14), guitar (14)
Mark Crew – keyboards (2, 4), programming (2, 4)
Billy Ray Cyrus – background vocals (13)
Snake Davis – saxophone (1)
Abi Flynn – background vocals (6–8, 10, 11)
Wayne Hector – background vocals (11)
Tyler Joseph – background vocals (12)
Michael Logan – background vocals (8)
Tom Mann – guitar (4)
Adam Messinger – programming (5, 8), background vocals (8)
Ray Parker Jr. – background vocals (8)
Chris Powell – drums (14), band claps (14), shaker (14), spoons (14)
Leroy Powell – electric guitar (14)
Dan Priddy – background vocals (2, 4), guitar (4), keyboards (2, 4), programming (2, 4)
Mark Ralph – bass (6, 7, 10, 11), guitar (6, 7, 10, 11), keyboards (5–7, 10, 11), percussion (5–7, 10, 11), programming (5–8, 10, 11)
Jack Savoretti – background vocals (7)
Donnell Spencer Jr. – background vocals (8)
David Stewart – acoustic guitar (1, 3), background vocals (1, 3), bass (1, 3, 8), drum programming (1, 3), drums (1, 3), electric guitar (1, 3), keyboards (1, 3, 8), percussion (1, 3, 8), synthesizers (1, 3)
Johnny Thirkel – trumpet (1)
Darrell Thorp – drum programming (14)
Tom Walsh – trumpet (1)
Fred Washington – background vocals (8)
Dennis White – drum programming (6–8, 10, 11), drums (6–8, 11), percussion (6, 7, 10, 11), programming (8)
Tom White – trombone (1)

Production

David Baron – producer (13), engineer (13)
Milan Becker – engineer (3)
Bryce Bordone – mixing assistant (1)
Gemma Chester – engineering assistant (6, 7, 9–11)
Dave Cobb – producer (14)
Matt Colton – mastering (2, 4–14)
Mark Crew – producer (2, 4), engineer (2, 4)
Simon Felice – producer (13)
Serban Ghenea – mixing (1)
Josh Green – engineer (6, 7, 9–11)
Renee Hikari – engineer (13)
Jonathan Hucks – engineer (1, 3)
Tyler Joseph – producer (12), vocal engineering (12)
Paul Meany – co-producer (12)
Randy Merrill – mastering (1, 3)
Adam Messinger – producer (5, 8), vocal engineering (5, 8)
Sean Phelan – engineer (1, 3)
Dan Priddy – producer (2, 4)
Mark Ralph – mixing (2, 4–12), additional production (5, 12), producer (6, 7, 9–11), vocal engineering (10)
Olle Romo – vocal engineering programming (5, 8, 10), vocal engineering (12)
Mark "Spike" Stent – mixing (3, 13, 14)
David Stewart – producer (1, 3)
Darrell Thorp – engineer (14)
Matt Wolach – mixing assistant (13, 14)

Other personnel
Louie Banks – photography
Jerry Heiden – package design

Charts

References

2023 albums
Albums produced by Mark Ralph (record producer)
Republic Records albums
Shania Twain albums